Jon Gordon Langseth Jr. (born January 29, 1981), known as Jonny Lang, is an American blues, gospel, and rock singer, songwriter, and guitarist. He has made five albums that have charted on the top 50 of the Billboard 200 chart and won a Grammy Award for Turn Around.

Biography
Jonny Lang was born in Fargo, North Dakota, United States, of Norwegian descent. He started playing the guitar for his friends at age 12. He played modern hits to the classics, even performing a rendition of Jimi Hendrix's take on the National Anthem. Soon after his father took him to see the Bad Medicine Blues Band, one of the few blues bands in Fargo, Lang started taking guitar lessons from Ted Larsen, the band's guitar player. Several months after Lang began, he joined the band, which was then renamed Kid Jonny Lang & The Big Bang. Two years later A&M Records, then home of Janet Jackson and Soundgarden, was invited to come to see him at a live performance at Bunkers Bar in Minneapolis, and he was signed to the label becoming the latest in a trend of young blues guitarists that then included Kenny Wayne Shepherd and Derek Trucks. The band moved to Minneapolis, Minnesota, and independently released the album Smokin''' when Lang was 14. He was signed to A&M Records in 1996. He released Lie to Me on January 28, 1997. The next album, Wander this World, was released on October 20, 1998, and earned a Grammy nomination. This was followed by the more soulful Long Time Coming on October 14, 2003. Lang also made a cover of Edgar Winter's "Dying to Live". Lang's 2006 album, the gospel-influenced Turn Around, won him his first Grammy Award.

In his earliest performing years, Lang always performed barefoot on stage because "it feels good" and once in tribute to Luther Allison, a friend who had recently died. He has since given up that practice, after several near-accidents and electric shocks.

In more than ten years on the road, Lang has toured with the Rolling Stones, Buddy Guy, Aerosmith, B.B. King, Blues Traveler, Jeff Beck and Sting. In1999 he was invited to play for a White House audience that included President and Mrs. Clinton. Earlier that year he was selected by the newly elected Minnesota Governor Jesse Ventura to perform at his Inaugural Ball. Lang also makes a cameo appearance in the film Blues Brothers 2000 as a janitor. In 2004, Eric Clapton asked Lang to play at the Crossroads Guitar Festival to raise money for the Crossroads Centre Antigua.

Lang also appears regularly as a part of the Experience Hendrix Tour along with many other well-known guitarists to pay tribute to the deceased guitar legend.

Musical equipment
Jonny Lang, since the beginning with The Big Bang, has used a 1972 Fender Telecaster Thinline made by the Fender Custom Shop, as well as a 1958 reissue custom shop Gibson Les Paul in more recent years as his sound and style have grown and flourished.  His original Custom Shop Tele - with a black flamed maple top, flamed maple neck, pearl signature inlay and his trademark pinup girl character on the aft body was stolen some years ago.  He has added a couple more custom thin-line teles-all carrying the basic aesthetic motif, but with varying colors from a burnt orange/amber to a deep violet throughout the years since.  The 1972 Fender Telecaster Thin line is a semi-hollow spruce body, maple top, and a maple neck and fretboard. He has not, however, sported the pearl "Jonny Lang" signature inlay since his original custom tele, but still stays true to his WWII-style pinup girl at body artwork. Jonny's Telecasters have three Bill Lawrence Pickups (500L Neck, 500XL Bridge) with a 5-way pickup switch and a coil tap for accessing a single-coil tone. On his pedalboard for his 2014 tour was the Analog Man King of Tone, a Whirlwind The Bomb boost, a Visual Sound V2 Route 808, a Full tone Ultimate Octave, a JAM Pedals Tube Dreamer, and a Boss AW-3 Dynamic Wah. On this tour, he played his Custom Shop Tele and the 1958 reissue Custom Shop Gibson Les Paul through a pair of modified Fender ’65 Deluxe Reverb amps. Jonny also used an arbiter Fuzz Face and an Electro Harmonix POG for The Experience Hendrix tour. Lang has also used Audio tech Guitar Products ABC Selector CCM on his 2005 acoustic tour.

The Fender Telecaster featured on the cover of Lie to Me is not a Telecaster but an original Fender Esquire.  Upon filming the music video for the title track "Lie to Me" which took place in a San Francisco music store, the store owner suggested Lang play the Esquire in the video.  Lang fell in love with the guitar and it was purchased and given to him as a gift.  He continues to use it, but not as often as his Custom Shop Telecaster and Signature Series Les Paul.

Band personnel
From 1993 to 1996, Lang's backing band was the Big Bang. This group consisted of three founding members of the Bad Medicine Blues Band: Ted "Lightnin' Boy" Larsen on guitar, his brother Michael Rey Larsen on drums, and Jeff Hayenga on bass. Keyboardist Bruce McCabe joined The Big Bang in 1995 after Lang and this young band from Fargo impressed him with their set opening for McCabe's band at the time, The Hoopsnakes.

From 1996 to 2004, Lang's backing band included Paul Diethelm on guitar, Bruce McCabe on keyboards, Doug Nelson on bass and Billy Thommes on drums. Also appearing on keyboards during 2003 and 2004 was Donnie La Marca, filling in for McCabe during his break from touring. Nelson was killed in a traffic accident in 2000 and was replaced by Billy Franze. Franze was in turn replaced by Jim Anton in 2003. Saxophone player David Eiland was added in 2000, providing Lang with a foil for extended instrumental jams. In 2005, Lang replaced the entire lineup, except for Anton, and embarked on an acoustic tour. He performed with Wendy Alane Wright at the 2000 pre-Grammy party. Guitarist Reeve Carney was the band's opening act for several shows in 2005, as well as for the 2006 and 2007 tours.

The recent band lineup includes Barry Alexander from Minneapolis on drums, Jim Anton from Minneapolis on bass, Akil Thompson from Nashville on rhythm guitar, Dwan Hill from Nashville on keys, Missi Hale from Los Angeles on background vocals. 

Lang's current band line up is Barry Alexander on drums, Jim Anton on bass, Tyrus Sass on keyboards and Zane Carney on rhythm guitar.

Recent years

On September 17, 2013, Lang released his first studio album in seven years, Fight for My Soul.Signs, was released on September 1, 2017 in Europe, and on September 8, in North America.

On January 12, 2021, it was announced that all confirmed concert dates were canceled until further notice because of a medical issue that affects Lang's singing.

Personal life
Family
Lang married former Kids Incorporated cast member Haylie Johnson on June 8, 2001, making him the brother-in-law of actress Ashley Johnson. Lang and his wife share the same birthday, although she is one year older. They live in Los Angeles and have five children.

Lang has two older sisters, Stephanie and Heidi Jo. He also has one younger sister, Jessica ("Jesse"), who was a contestant on season 8 of American Idol.

 Conversion to Christianity 
Lang became a Christian in 2000. In an interview with Sara Groves in Christianity Today, Lang gave details about his conversion, assuring her that he had had a supernatural experience with the Holy Ghost. In his own words, he has said that he formerly "hated Christianity" and "despised the things of God", but now he wants to share with others about Jesus' love.

The songs "Only a Man" and "Thankful" from his album Turn Around, are about his belief in God. He has also co-written a couple of songs with contemporary Christian music artist Steven Curtis Chapman, notably "My Love Remains".

Discography
Studio albums
 1995 Smokin' (Kid Jonny Lang & The Big Bang)
 1997 Lie to Me, No. 44 (Billboard 200)
 1998 Wander This World, No. 28 (Billboard 200) 
 2003 Long Time Coming, No. 17 (Billboard 200)
 2006 Turn Around, No. 35 (Billboard 200), No. 1 (Billboard Christian Albums) 
 2009 Live at the Ryman, No. 2 (Billboard Blues Albums)
 2013 Fight for My Soul, No. 50 (Billboard 200), No. 1 (Billboard Blues Albums), No. 2 (Billboard Christian Albums)
 2017 Signs, No. 153 (Billboard 200)

Guest appearances
 1997: A Very Special Christmas 3 album - by various artists, performed on track "Santa Claus Is Back in Town".
 1998: Blues Brothers 2000 original soundtrack - by various artists, performed on track "634–5789".
 1998: Heavy Love album - by Buddy Guy, performed on track "Midnight Train".
 1999: Loud Guitars, Big Suspicions album - by Shannon Curfman, performed on multiple tracks and co-wrote "Love Me Like That".
 1999: For Love of the Game original soundtrack, performed on track "Paint It Black".
 2000: It Ain't Nothin' But the Blues original cast recording, performed on tracks "Someone Else is Steppin' In" and "The Thrill is Gone".
 2000: This Time Around album by Hanson, performed on tracks "You Never Know," "This Time Around" and "Hand in Hand".
 2000: Milk Cow Blues album - by Willie Nelson, performed on tracks "Rainy Day Blues" and "Ain't Nobody's Business".
 2001: Been a Long Time album - by Double Trouble, performed on track "Ground Hog Day" with Gordie Johnson of Big Sugar.
 2001: Ash Wednesday Blues album - by Anders Osborne, performed on tracks "Snake Bit Again", "Soul Livin'", "Me & Lola", "Aim Way High", and "Improvise".
 2004: All Things New album - by Steven Curtis Chapman, performed on track "Only Getting Started".
 2004: Eric Clapton: Crossroads Guitar Festival, performed on track "Give Me Up Again".
 2005: Possibilities album - by Herbie Hancock, performed on track "When Love Comes to Town" with Joss Stone.
 2007: A Deeper Level album - by Israel Houghton, performed on track "You Are Not Forgotten".
 2009: Oh Happy Day album - by various artists, performed on track "I Believe" with the Fisk Jubilee Singers Lang performed the song live on The Tonight Show with Jay Leno on April 16, 2009.
 2009: Lines, Vines and Trying Times album - by Jonas Brothers, performed on track "Hey Baby".
 2010: Up Close album - by Eric Johnson, performed on track "Austin".
 2010: What We Want, What We Get album - by Dave Barnes, performed on track "What I Need".
 2010: 6 String Theory album - by Lee Ritenour, performed on track "Why I Sing The Blues" with B.B. King and Vince Gill.
 2010: Memphis Blues album - by Cyndi Lauper, performed on tracks "How Blue Can You Get?" and "Crossroads".
 2010: Guitar Heaven: The Greatest Guitar Classics of All Time album - by Santana, performed on track "I Ain't Superstitious".
 2010: Eric Clapton: Crossroads Guitar Festival 2010 album - by various artists, performed on tracks "Five Long Years" and "Miss You" with Buddy Guy and Ronnie Wood.
 2011: ZZ Top: A Tribute from Friends album - by various artists, performed on track "Sharp Dressed Man" as the M.O.B. with Mick Fleetwood, Steven Tyler and John McVie.
 2012: Featuring Mato Nanji album - by Indigenous, performed on track "Free Yourself, Free Your Mind".
 2012: Show Me Love album - by V Reyes, performed on track "Man Enough", also featuring Tim Lang.
 2013: Still Climbing album - by Leslie West, performed on track "When a Man Loves a Woman."

Filmography and television appearances
 1997: Disney Channel's In Concert 1997: Late Night with Conan O'Brien
 1998: Blues Brothers 2000 1998: The Drew Carey Show'' - episode "In Ramada Da Vida" (cameo)
 2003: Late Show with David Letterman
 2004: Eric Clapton's Crossroads Guitar Festival 2004
 2006:  Kennedy Center Honors tribute to Smokey Robinson
 2008: Live at Montreux 1999 DVD 
 2010: Eric Clapton's Crossroads Guitar Festival 2010
 2021: Great Performances: Mick Fleetwood and Friends

References

1981 births
20th-century American male singers
20th-century American singers
21st-century American male singers
21st-century American singers
American blues guitarists
American male guitarists
American blues singers
American gospel singers
Converts to Christianity
Grammy Award winners
Living people
Singers from North Dakota
People from Fargo, North Dakota
Songwriters from North Dakota
20th-century American guitarists
21st-century American guitarists
Guitarists from North Dakota
American people of Norwegian descent
American male songwriters
Provogue Records artists